Basenj also known as Basinj is a village in Badakhshan Province in north-eastern Afghanistan.

On 11 August 2021, Taliban militants reportedly captured the area in addition to capturing the capital of Badakhshan Province; Fayzabad.

References

External links
Satellite map at Maplandia.com

Populated places in Nusay District